The 1991 European Women Basketball Championship, commonly called EuroBasket Women 1991, was the 23rd regional championship held by FIBA Europe. The competition was held in Israel and took place from 12 June to 17 June 1991.  won the gold medal and  the silver medal while  won the bronze.

Squads

Qualification

Group A

Group B

First stage

Group A

Group B

Play-off stages

Final standings

External links 
 FIBA Europe profile
 Todor66 profile

1991
1991 in Israeli women's sport
International women's basketball competitions hosted by Israel
June 1991 sports events in Asia
Euro
Women